Dypterygia nicea is a moth of the family Noctuidae. It is found on the Andamans and Nicobar islands.

Hadeninae
Moths described in 1901